Adelowalkeria is a genus of moths in the family Saturniidae first described by Travassos in 1941.

Species
Adelowalkeria caeca Lemaire, 1969
Adelowalkeria eugenia (Druce, 1904) — Ecuador
Adelowalkeria flavosignata (Walker, 1865) — southern Brazil
Adelowalkeria plateada (Schaus, 1905) — Ecuador
Adelowalkeria torresi Travassos & May, 1941
Adelowalkeria tristygma (Boisduval, 1872)

References

Ceratocampinae